The Little Missouri River is a tributary of the Missouri River,  long, in the northern Great Plains of the United States. In South Dakota, it flows northward through the Badlands into North Dakota, crossing the Little Missouri National Grassland and both units of Theodore Roosevelt National Park.

The highly seasonal runoff from badlands and other treeless landscapes along the Little Missouri carries heavy loads of eroded sediment downstream.  The sedimentary layers, which extend from the headwaters in Wyoming all the way to the mouth in North Dakota, vary in age, but most of the beds along the river belong to the Bullion Creek and Sentinel Butte formations, both deposited during the Paleocene (about 66 to 56 million years ago). The deposits include siltstone, claystone, sandstone, and lignite coal laid down in a coastal plain during the Laramide orogeny.

See also

List of rivers of North Dakota
List of longest rivers of the United States (by main stem)
List of rivers of Montana
List of rivers of South Dakota
List of rivers of Wyoming
Montana Stream Access Law

References

External links
Wyoming State River Plan: Little Missouri River
The Lewis and Clark Trail: The Little Missouri River
National Park Service: North Dakota Segments
2016 Theodore Roosevelt National Park Quarter image (depicting the Little Missouri River)

Rivers of Montana
Rivers of North Dakota
Rivers of South Dakota
Rivers of Wyoming
Tributaries of the Missouri River
Rivers of Carter County, Montana
Theodore Roosevelt National Park
Rivers of Harding County, South Dakota
Bodies of water of Crook County, Wyoming